This is a list of players that have made over 100 appearances for Bath City Football Club. Bath’s history is entirely in non-league football, predominantly in the fourth tier from 1921 to 1959 (before the formation of the Football League Fourth Division in 1959) and then the fifth tier from 1960 to the early 2000s, though being relegated to the sixth on several occasions. Bath narrowly missed out on election to the Football League by a small margin in 1959, 1978 and in 1985. The club have a good history in the FA Cup, reaching the third round six times, and have beaten league sides including Crystal Palace (in 1931), Millwall (in 1959), and Cardiff City (in 1992). Bath's record appearance maker is Dave Mogg, who made 515 appearances over a 16-year period with the club. Tony Ricketts has the second most appearances with 506. Players with more than 400 appearances include Dave Singleton, Dave Palmer and Jim Rollo.

List of players 
 Appearances and goals are for first-team competitive matches only, including Southern Football League, Alliance premier league, National League, National League South, FA Cup and FA Trophy.
 matches from the abandoned 1939–40 season are excluded.
 Players are listed according to the date of their first-team debut for the club

References 

 

Football-related lists
Bath City F.C.-related lists